USS Key West (SSN-722), a , is the third ship of the United States Navy to be named after Key West, Florida.

Construction
The contract to build her was awarded to Newport News Shipbuilding and Dry Dock Company in Newport News, Virginia, on 13 August 1981, and her keel was laid down on 6 July 1983. She was launched on 20 July 1985, sponsored by Mrs. Virginia Conn, and commissioned on 12 September 1987, with Commander Warren Lipscomb, Jr. in command. She is the fourth  equipped with the vertical launch system (VLS) capable of carrying 12 Tomahawk land attack cruise missiles (TLAM).

Service history
Key West was home ported at the Norfolk Naval Base, Norfolk, Virginia. She operated out of Norfolk, until 1995. During her Atlantic Fleet service, she completed numerous Cold War deployments and supported operations in the Caribbean, Western Atlantic and Mediterranean. Key West was awarded the "Hook-em" antisubmarine warfare (ASW) excellence award following her 1990 Mediterranean Cruise. She later was awarded the Meritorious Unit Commendation award for her superior performance in Cold War operations during the 1989 and 1990 deployments. Key West won the "TOP TORP" Torpedo Shooting Competition in 1992, and was later awarded the Submarine Squadron Eight Battle "E" for that year.

Key West deployed with the  Carrier Battle Group in 1995. During that deployment she operated in the Mediterranean Sea and Persian Gulf and was awarded the Navy Unit Commendation, Armed Forces Service, and NATO Service medals. Following the 1995 deployment, Key West underwent an availability in Norfolk, in preparation for her transfer to the Pacific Fleet in 1996. She departed Norfolk, in June 1996, and transited the Panama Canal as part of her transfer to the Pacific Fleet. She arrived in Pearl Harbor, Hawaii in July 1996, and began operations under Submarine Squadron One.

Key West visited her name sake city in 1987, for a week-long celebration after commissioning, 1992, and 1994. Since reassignment to the Pacific Fleet she has not been able to visit Key West again.

In April 1997, Key West conducted her first Pacific deployment with the  Carrier Battle Group. During this deployment, she operated in the Pacific Ocean, Indian Ocean and the Persian Gulf. Later that year, Key West was reassigned to Submarine Squadron Three.

From 1998 through 2001, she supported Pacific theater operations in both the Third Fleet and Seventh Fleet area of operations. During this time she participated in numerous bilateral and multilateral exercises with our Pacific Theater partner. Following the 11 September attacks, she was redirected Bahrain to the Northern Arabian Sea where she launched Tomahawk Land Attack Cruise Missiles against Afghanistan in October 2001.

In 2003, 2005 and 2007 Key West conducted deployments to the Western Pacific in support of Seventh Fleet operations.

In 2007, Key West was named "Battle E" for COMSUBRON THREE, given to the best submarine in its squadron, awarded the Arleigh Burke Trophy for the most improved sea command in the Pacific, and awarded the Naval Unit Commendation for its outstanding accomplishments during the deployment.

In 2009, Key West was again awarded the "Battle E" award for COMSUBRON Three for outstanding performance during the 2009 WESTPAC deployment.

In 2012, Key West shifted home port to Naval Base Guam to support Seventh Fleet operations as a forward deployed unit.

On 31 October 2022, Key West arrived at Busan, South Korea for a scheduled port visit.

Key West returned from her final deployment in November 2022.

On 16 January 2023 Key West arrived at the Puget Sound Naval Shipyard and was placed in the reserve fleet to await decommissoning.

Command emblem

The conch shell is the focal point of the submarine's emblem for the fabled horn of the Greek God Triton and the symbol of the submarine's namesake city. Key West is emerging from the shell which symbolizes the emergence of the city as the leading city of the Florida Keys.

The submarine insignia symbolizes the heritage that the ship has with all past and future submarines.  The motto "Liberate Clavis Tenacitas et Ingenium" translates to "The Key to Freedom is Tenacity and Resourcefulness".  Specifically, the phrase "The Key to Freedom" represents the namesake city and the submarine's mission to protect the fundamental rights and liberties of the American people. The phrase "Tenacity and Resourcefulness" was used by the Mayor of Key West during his speech at the ship's launching to describe the characteristics of a true Conch —a native of Key West. Additionally, "Ingenium" is a word used by the ancient Greek and Roman historians to describe the resourcefulness and ingenuity of sailors in the period.

In popular fiction
In the Tom Clancy novel Red Storm Rising, Key West participated in a cruise missile strike against the Soviet Union.

In the novel Kirov III-Pacific Storm by John Schettler, Key West is involved in a critical action with the Russian Battlecruiser Kirov II.

In the Swedish novel Landsförrädaren by Anders Jallai, Key West makes an appearance to save the protagonist.

References

Los Angeles-class submarines
Cold War submarines of the United States
Nuclear submarines of the United States Navy
1985 ships
Submarines of the United States
Ships built in Newport News, Virginia